The 2021–22 season is Fudbalski Klub Partizan's 75th season in existence and the club's 16th competing in the Serbian SuperLiga.

Transfers

In

Out

Players

Squad

Friendlies

Competitions

Overview

Serbian SuperLiga

Regular season

League table

Results by matchday

Results

Championship round

Results by matchday

Results

Serbian Cup

UEFA Europa Conference League

Second qualifying round

Third qualifying round

Play-off round

Group stage

Results

Knockout Phase

Knockout round play-offs

Round of 16

Statistics

Squad statistics

|-
! colspan=14 style="background:black; color:white; text-align:center;"| Goalkeepers

|-
! colspan=14 style="background:black; color:white; text-align:center;"| Defenders

|-
! colspan=14 style="background:black; color:white; text-align:center;"| Midfielders

|-
! colspan=14 style="background:black; color:white; text-align:center;"| Forwards

|-
! colspan=14 style="background:black; color:white; text-align:center;"| Players transferred out during the season

Goal scorers

Last updated: 27 May 2022

Clean sheets

Last updated: 22 May 2022

Disciplinary record

Last updated: 27 May 2022

Game as captain 

Last updated: 27 May 2022

References

FK Partizan seasons
Partizan
2021–22 UEFA Europa Conference League participants seasons